Edith Agnes Smith (October 2, 1867 – 1954) was a Canadian painter and teacher.  She was one of the original members of the Maritime Art Association and served as President of the Nova Scotia Museum of Fine Arts.

Biography
She was born in Halifax, Nova Scotia on October 2, 1867, one of four children of Benjamin Smith, a well known Halifax dry goods merchant and Anna Maria Smith. She studied art at the Victoria School of Art and Design. She continued her studies at the Chelsea School of Art in London, United Kingdom and the Boston Art Club in Boston, Massachusetts.

In Halifax Smith was involved in the artistic community as a member of the Nova Scotia Museum of Fine Arts and working to find the museum a permanent home. She was also involved with assembling the nascent museum's collection, including works by works by Frances Jones Bannerman, Lewis Smith, Stanley Royle, Marion Bond, and Arthur Lismer.

From 1915-1950 Smith taught at the Halifax Ladies' College (now Armbrae Academy).

She exhibited her art frequently at the Nova Scotia Society of Artists, the Maritime Art Association, and the National Gallery of Canada.

Smith died at Petite Riviere, Nova Scotia in 1954.

References

1867 births
1954 deaths
Canadian people of British descent
Artists from Nova Scotia
People from Halifax, Nova Scotia
Canadian women painters
19th-century Canadian painters
20th-century Canadian painters
19th-century Canadian women artists
20th-century Canadian women artists
Alumni of Chelsea College of Arts
NSCAD University alumni